Kashabowie Outposts (Eva Lake) Water Aerodrome  is located on Eva Lake  west of Kashabowie, Thunder Bay District in Northwestern Ontario, Canada.

See also
Kashabowie/Upper Shebandowan Lake Water Aerodrome

References

Registered aerodromes in Ontario
Transport in Thunder Bay District
Seaplane bases in Ontario